What Women Want is a surviving 1920 silent film drama directed by George Archainbaud and starring Louise Huff.

A print is preserved in the Library of Congress collection.

Cast
Louise Huff - Francine D'Espard
Van Dyke Brooke - William Holliday Sr.
Robert Ames - William Holliday Jr.
Clara Beyers - Countess de Chevigny
Howard Truesdale - Ezekiel Bates
Betty Brown - Susan

References

External links
What Women Want at IMDB.com

1920 films
American silent feature films
Films directed by George Archainbaud
American black-and-white films
Silent American drama films
1920 drama films
1920s American films